The Crow River is a river in Arthur's Pass National Park, Canterbury, New Zealand. It arises near Mount Rolleston and flows south into the Waimakariri River.

It was named after a South Island kokako, sometimes called orange-wattled crow, which was seen in 1865 during an exploration of the area. The species was last seen in the 1930s and is probably extinct.

The New Zealand Department of Conservation maintains a tramping track alongside the river, and a backcountry hut is available for trampers.

See also
List of rivers of New Zealand
Anti Crow River

References

Land Information New Zealand - Search for Place Names

Rivers of Canterbury, New Zealand
Rivers of New Zealand